South Africa–Sweden relations refers to the bilateral relations between Sweden and South Africa. Sweden has an embassy in Pretoria and South Africa has an embassy in Stockholm.

Formal relations between the two countries began with the opening of a South African legation in the 1930s with relations being upgraded to ambassadorial level in 1994 following South Africa's first non-racial democratic elections. In 2000 a South African - Swedish Binational Commission was established by President Thabo Mbeki and Prime Minister Göran Persson.

During apartheid Sweden lent significant support for the anti-apartheid movement within South Africa.  During the 1960s a nationwide anti-apartheid movement was established in Sweden leading to Sweden becoming the only western country to give official support to the anti-apartheid movement in South Africa during the early 1970s.

In 2015 an estimated 18,000 South Africans were employed by Swedish companies.

See also 
 Foreign relations of South Africa
 Foreign relations of Sweden
 South Africa–European Union relations

References

 
Sweden
Bilateral relations of Sweden